Shattered Spirits is a 1986 American television drama film directed by Robert Greenwald, starring Martin Sheen, Melinda Dillon, Matthew Labyorteaux, Lukas Haas, and Roxana Zal.  Sheen plays an alcoholic father who loses his family.

Plot
Lyle Mollencamp is an alcoholic. His wife, Joyce, struggles to cover their family's distress. His three children react in different ways: Kenny has become rebellious; Lesley has totally immersed herself in school activities, and 8 year old Brian has been shielded from his father's problems. That's only until Lyle's drinking costs him his job and spoils Brian's birthday. For Kenny it's the last straw. The confrontation between father and son is so explosive that Lyle must deal with his problem. Lyle goes into rehab for 86 days and returns home for an outdoor picnic.  He immediately orders changes and dominates the family.  In a fit of rage, he storms off and buys a bottle of liquor.  He returns home with the bottle unopened.  Will he succeed or remain in a home of shattered spirits?

Cast
Martin Sheen ... Lyle Mollencamp
Melinda Dillon ... Joyce Mollencamp
Matthew Labyorteaux ... Kenny Mollencamp
Lukas Haas ... Brian Mollencamp
Roxana Zal ... Lesley Mollencamp
Jill Schoelen ... Allison
Jenny Gago ... Mavis

Reception
Los Angeles Times reviewer Lee Margulies says the film outlines the well known pernicious effects of alcoholism on the Mollencamp family.  The film chronicles the grim, often painful detail of "the lives of alcoholic Lyle Mollencamp, his weak, apologetic wife and their three emotionally scarred children."  The toll taken on the family from the father's lies, denial and guilt and the mother's enabling weakness leads to a broken home.  He finds a uniformly excellent cast and especially likes Matthew Laborteaux "the 15-year-old boy who is most affected by, yet least forgiving, of his father's behavior."  The movie ends on hope with the father a far way from recovery.

References

1986 films
1986 drama films
1986 television films
ABC network original films
Films about alcoholism
Films directed by Robert Greenwald
Films scored by Michael Hoenig
1980s English-language films